Cimarron is an unincorporated rural hamlet in Montrose County, Colorado, United States.  It is located on the northern side of U.S. Highway 50, 19 miles from the town of Montrose to its west, and 42 miles from Gunnison, Colorado Gunnison to its east.  There is a store with fuel pumps and a post office at Cimarron. The post office services the rural ZIP Code 81220 area.

Cimarron is located along the Cimarron River, just south of the Black Canyon of the Gunnison, and just outside Curecanti National Recreation Area. The D & RG Narrow Gauge Trestle crosses the Cimarron River gorge just northeast of town, and is on the National Register of Historic Places (#76000172).

Geography
Cimarron is located at  (38.441758,-107.555981).

See also

Outline of Colorado
Index of Colorado-related articles
State of Colorado
Colorado cities and towns
Colorado counties
Montrose County, Colorado
Colorado metropolitan areas
Montrose, CO Micropolitan Statistical Area
Black Canyon of the Gunnison National Park
Cimarron River
Curecanti National Recreation Area
D & RG Narrow Gauge Trestle
Morrow Point Dam

References

Unincorporated communities in Montrose County, Colorado
Gunnison River
Curecanti National Recreation Area
Unincorporated communities in Colorado